The characters of the Japanese visual novel Popotan were designed by Akio Watanabe under the alias Poyoyon♡Rock, and the characters in the anime adaptation were designed by Rondo Mizukami and based on Akio Watanabe's original concepts for the visual novel. The series takes place on a fictional Earth in which exist supernatural beings with powers and follows three such supernatural sisters as they travel through time in a mansion, searching for the reason for their journey. Though many of the characters in the visual novel share personality traits and character relations with their anime counterparts, there are numerous differences between the two media. Both the visual novel and anime have mutually exclusive characters in addition to the changes in character roles.

In the visual novel, the player controls Chris, a slacker who roams from town to town until he comes across the unnamed town that is the setting of Popotan. The story centers on him as he moves in with three sisters and their maid (all of whom become the protagonists for the anime) and his transformation in his lifestyle. In the anime, the primary protagonists of the series are the three sisters, Ai, Mai and Mii. Ai is a compassionate, motherly figure whose overly compassionate nature often causes problems. Mai is a tomboy who wishes for the quest to end and to live a normal life. Mii is an energetic child who likes to cosplay and help people in trouble. Early on, the series explored the characters' personalities by focusing on a single character per episode. The sisters' maid, Mea, is portrayed as a secondary protagonist in the anime, but is portrayed as a primary protagonist in the  radio drama that is a continuation of the anime.

Main characters

Chris

 is the protagonist of the story whom the player controls. He is a high-school dropout and slacker who gave up on the world. He wanders from city to city playing his guitar to make just enough money to cover his living expenses. He moves in with the three sisters because they charge cheap rent and he likes staying in a house full of girls; however, he quickly learns he must change his slacker ways.  As the game progresses, Chris has the possibility of developing a romantic relationship with one of the girls; at first this is limited to the three sisters: Ai, Mai and Mii, but after completing at least one of their routes, five other girls will be accessible. Since the visual novel revolves around him, the only time his character is seen is during event sequences; however, in the fan disc, his image is visually represented along with the other characters.

Sisters
In the visual novel their roles are as principal romancable characters for the protagonist while in the anime they, along with their maid, Mea, take on the roles of the protagonist. The three sisters, Ai, Mai and Mii, all have supernatural powers that differ based loosely on their personality type. All three live together under the same roof of a Western-style mansion with a maid helping take care of their needs.

Ai
, the oldest sister and acting landlord of the mansion. Aged 18, she is the only major character with large breasts and often wears a Santa Claus-style hat over her green hair. She is near-sighted and needs glasses to see clearly; additionally, she has a no sense of direction. Ai is a motherly figure and constantly tries to help people. She does most of the chores their maid does not, and, loves to cook despite being an incompetent. Her easygoing caring nature often leads her to fail things because she cannot muster the resolve to criticize others. Believing she is ugly and fat, Ai wears clothing and glasses to hide behind. This is why she allows Chris to stay with them when she finds out he has nowhere else to go. Ai also loves to take baths, more than once a day if possible. She also seems to be the de facto caretaker of the sisters' pet ferret, Unagi, which hides under her hat. Ai has the ability to speak to plants, specifically dandelions, which she and her sisters refer to as "popotan".

In the anime, Ai becomes accustomed to the time traveling and non-aging and is mostly unaffected by it until she meets Daichi as an adult. She uses her ability help them find Shizuku, whom the sisters are searching for. Ai is voiced by Mayu Fujisaki in the visual novel; in the anime she is voiced in Japanese by Sayaka Ohara and in English by Nicole Oliver.

Mai
, the middle sister at 14, has pink hair and usually wears sporty clothes. Mai is constantly reminded of her small breast size by her younger sister Mii, which causes her to lose her temper. Mai goes to school with Mii and has a friend there, Konami, who knows Chris from the past. Although she is the middle sister, Mai governs household affairs such as the budget. She longs to leave the mansion but does not want to burden Ai whom she knows does not have the willpower to deal with such responsibilities. Mai has a tomboyish personality and is very short-tempered, especially when it comes to Chris, the more so when she thinks she'll lose face. She is the only character who vehemently opposes Chris's staying at the mansion, despite the fact that he pays rent.

Mai's role is more prominent in the anime. Early in the season she had problems with constantly moving; because she thought everyone hated her after making friends and then abandoning them, she became so depressed that she refused to go to school. She understood the impact of their journeys on others, but unlike Ai, did not have the maturity to cope with it. Early on in the series she makes friends with a classmate of hers, Konami. When it was time for Mai to leave, Konami helped convince Mai that she was wrong and in consolation Konami left a sketch portrait of Mai she made for a class assignment as a departing gift stating that they will remain friends forever, even if they never see each other again. While waiting for Mai's return, Konami dies two years before the mansion is in a location where the two could meet again. Later in the series, Mai meets Konami's daughter; she initially mistakes her for Konami but quickly learns her name is Mai and that she was named by Konami in memory of her friend. Mai discovers that Konami's daughter has more in common with her than a name: she, like her namesake, feels that everyone hates her. As a result, Mai feels it her duty to both Konami and her daughter to show her that way of thinking was wrong, just as Konami did for her. Mai ultimately gave up and failed at the time when she Konami had still been waiting for her even as she lay dying. This, compounded with Keith's words about the pain the girls bring to others, reawakening her depression in a much deeper manner. When she returns to visit Konami later and leaves, as a departing request, asks Konami to explain to her daughter what she felt so that she would not follow the same path as the younger sister Mai. Along with Mea, the maid, Mai is left at one point when the mansion disappears into the future without them. It is during this time that Mai realizes that she cannot age and Ai explains the connection to the mansion and aging process. Mai is voiced by Mio Oukawa in the visual novel; in the anime she is voiced in Japanese by Masumi Asano and in English by Nicole Bouma.

Mii
, the youngest sister at 11, has light purple hair that is often tied in a double-bun on her head, except when she cosplays as "Magical Girl Mii"; she then wears it in twin pony-tails. Mii goes to the same school as Mai. She goes around asking Chris to play with her almost anytime she sees him and loves to cosplay as a magical girl, "Magical Girl Mii", trying to help others out around town, though the results often vary. The game has more sexual scenes involving her than any other character. She tries to have sex with Chris early on and has sex with Mea, the maid, a few times.

Mii is not as lascivious in the anime, though she has an obsession with defining plushy things, especially Ai's breasts. She also loves to compare breast sizes of various females. Also, though she passes through time like the rest of the girls, her very naivete and energy allow her to overcome most of the jumps with ease.

"Magical Girl Mii" was used in the anime, though its origins were changed. In the anime it was a specialized cosplay costume she had created to mimic a magical girl television show which cost a lot of money, but Ai seemed easily able to pay for it. That episode she met a chronically ill girl named Miyuki and attempted to cheer up. After this, she wears it around and pretends to help stop evil and believes she has superpowers. Later during the episode, Miyuki collapsed from overexertion playing with Mii. Mii tried to use powers she thought she had to heal her. The attempt was successful, and Ai revealed to the viewers that Mii's special power was healing. However, Mii remains unaware of this for a good portion of the season, and continues to believe that she has other powers as well. After the episode, Mii continues to cosplay in the outfit with the same type of antics. Mii is voiced by Toromi in the visual novel; in the anime she is voiced in Japanese by Momoi Haruko and in English by Jocelyne Loewen.

Mea
, the sisters' maid, who is sometimes referred to as Mare in the visual novel and Mear in the fan book, is actually a lifelike android that has existed for a long time. Her scarlet hair is tied down into two long pigtails that reach her elbows. She appears completely unemotional, especially at the beginning of the game, but she has her own desires and  becomes friendlier with Chris as the story progresses to varying degrees depending upon whether it's her balls or not.

In the anime, Mii constantly points out Mea's small breast size, though she does not lose her temper like Mai. She also has a voracious appetite despite her diminutive figure. She starts out more robotic-like, but becomes less so as the story progresses, such as in Episode 4 when she becomes concerned and fixes the doll of a malevolent-but-lonely child's spirit and seems to make some emotional connection to it. These scenes though are largely seen only by the audience and not by any of the major characters. Mea is left behind with Mai when the house vanishes after visiting the hot springs. She and Mai later rejoin the group, when the mansion returns five years later to the same spot. While waiting for the mansion to return, she works as a rental maid in the area to keep things up with Mai. It is later revealed that Mea is a "guard" sent to help the girls along their journey and that Mea is working with Shizuku under Keith.

While Mea is listed officially as an android for the anime, it is unclear while watching Popotan that this is the case as there is no given reference, beyond her personality, to that effect. In episode four it is revealed she is not human, but the episode does not state what she is. Mea is voiced by Asumi Noda in the visual novel; in the anime she is voiced in Japanese by Mai Kadowaki and in English by Anna Cummer.

Shizuku
 can be recognized by light-green hair and a similarly colored poncho. Her calm, mature demeanor contrasts with her youthful appearance, and her age is never mentioned.  Chris meets her on a stroll at night and brings her back to the mansion. She lacks linguistic skills, and at first not much about her is learned. Because Shizuku is unable to take care of herself, Chris offers to pay her rent as well.

In the anime, Shizuku is the reason for the girls' travels. She is portrayed as a goddess of the dandelions; for most of the anime, is referred to by the three sisters as "The One" as they do not know her name. When the sisters finally meet Shizuku, she tests them by offering them a choice between returning to a time period of their choice or continuing their time-traveling. Shizuku is voiced by Minami Nagasaki in the visual novel and by Rumi Shishido in the Japanese anime  and by Nicole Leroux in the English anime.

Secondary Characters

Konami
 was Chris's girlfriend before he dropped out and left his old town; when she starts attending Mai's school, she and Mai become best friends. She has long brown hair and like most of the others, small breasts. Konami is a trendy, cheerful and optimistic girl with almost as much energy as Mii and just as much naivety. She rarely thinks of the consequences of her actions.

In the anime, she is responsible for breaking Mai's cyclical nature of her depression. She becomes a great artist and eventually has a daughter who she decided to name Mai; Mai, the sister, eventually meets her in the future and at first mistakes her for Konami. When Mai, the sister, returns to be with Konami after meeting with Konami, she asks Konami to teach her daughter that both of them enjoyed their friendship and never resented the other for leaving, hoping to change the personality of Mai. Konami is voiced by Miki Haruse in the visual novel, by Tomoko Kawakami in the Japanese anime, and by Tabitha St. Germain in the English anime.

Nono
 is a shy, blue-haired shrine maiden-in-training and daughter of the Goshintai clan who takes her training seriously. She takes care with cleaning the shrine and commutes to the same school as the rest of the girls. She also tries to do fortune telling in the city, though she is infamous for getting her fortunes wrong. She is the first major character Chris is introduced to in the game. At first she does not seem to fond of him because of his slacker mentality, but eventually gets over that.

In the anime, Nono is one of Mii's closest friends, though Nono seems to show quickly signs of wearing out under Mii's constant enthusiasm because she is slightly older than Mii and has been under rigorous training by her grandfather whom she cares for every much despite his often harsh treatment of  ways, especially holidays like Christmas. Nono is voiced by Junko Kusayanagi in the visual novel, by Sakura Nogawa in the Japanese anime, and by Brenna O'Brien in the English anime.

Claude
 is Chris's rival. Like Chris, Claude also plays the guitar, though he is more of a rock-star mentality. He has reddish-brown hair and wears black clothing with his guitar strapped to his back.
Depending upon how the story unfolds, Claude's appearance may be closer to that of a minor character in certain scenarios, though he still plays a key role in several endings. He is central to Konami's scenario as he attempts to rape her in it after he and some other members of his band seduce her, specifically because she has a relation with Chris. Since she is enthralled with Claude because he's a rockstar, she is easily blinded. In Mii's scenario, one of her several "Magical Gril Mii" mini-games involve Claude.

Daichi
 is a very kind and protective person. He is the first person seen in the anime as he takes pictures of the mansion which some students say is haunted. When he learns the truth, the girls decide to help him out. He, like Ai, goes out of his way to help his friends and is likely why the two connect. In the year 2000, as an adult, Daichi's daughter takes a picture at the beach and he sees the mansion where the girls lived, but obviously not in the same location he visited it. He goes to see them and meets Ai who becomes agitated because she does not know what to do. At the time she denies any connection, but later when he returns and is attacked by Keith she reveals the truth. As a child, Daichi is voiced in Japanese by Yuki Kaida and as an adult by Kenichi Suzumura; as a child, he is voiced in English by Reece Thompson and as an adult by Kirby Morrow.

Keith
 plays a role, along with Mea, as a "guide" and has special abilities similar to the girls. He first appears wearing a business suit with his distinguishing white hair in an attempt to help out Ai dissuade an adult Daichi who she really is because of the nature of the mansion and their agelessness. At first she welcomes him and sleeps with him, but later resents him after he attacks Daichi. Later on, Keith tries to convince Mai the actions they take only end up hurting those they befriend.

Keith works under Shizuku like Mea, but stronger and higher ranked than she. He often disagrees with her about the three sisters. While it appears he's trying to work against the girls, in one of the final scenes he's shown to be content with the decision they eventually make. Keith is voiced by Yuuji Takada in Japanese and by Brian Drummond in English.

Other characters

Kokoa
 has brown hair pulled back in a double braid and wears glasses. She is a manager of a rival convenience stores. Because of this, she comes off quite hostile to Chris at first.
Kokoa is semi-hidden romanceable character, though her level of interaction otherwise would be indistinguishable with a minor character. She is not listed among the official main characters on sites like Getchu, but does have her own character image and scene reminisce section. Kokoa is voiced by Mayu Ayatayo in the visual novel.

Unagi
, is a white female ferret that can transform into a humanoid hybrid; she is the only notable such hybrid of its type in any form of literature. In her humanoid form, Unagi is indistinguishable from a normal human except for her white tail. She also has white hair as well. She does not get along with Mii at all as Mii becomes jealous of the time she spends with Chris.

Unagi is essentially the mascot character for the series in both forms. She is used in the character menus for the navigating the game and introduces the next episode in her humanoid form in the anime.

In the game, she only appears in her humanoid form after completing Ai's route and choosing to play post-game scenario when starting a new game.

In the anime, she is essentially the family's pet and is found usually around Ai and dislikes Mii who torments her at times. She never transforms in any of the episodes and it's unclear whether she can. In the episode preview at the end of episode one, she explains she can, but the segment is in an out-of-storyline context. Unagi' is voiced by Kanon Torii in the visual novel;
  in the anime she is voiced in Japanese by Ayako Kawasumi and in English by Tabitha St. Germain.

Asuka
 is a female classmate of Daichi's who the latter has a crush on. Asuka believes in spirits because her grandmother died prior to the story's beginning and she felt that her grandmother's spirit was still around. When Daichi takes photos of the mansion, she's happy and even after they are found to be fake, she still is thankful for the gesture Daichi made to cheer her up. Later in the series, she marries Daichi, and makes an appearance as an adult in episode 7. Asuka is voiced by in Japanese Mai Nakahara and by in English Kelly Sheridan.

Mai (Konami's Daughter)
, Konami's daughter, is visually an exact duplicate of Konami. Emotionally she is completely the opposite. Where Konami was optimistic, she is pessimistic; where Konami was outgoing, she is an introvert; where her mother cherished Mai, the sister, she hates her. She appears only in the anime.

Mai, the daughter, eventually meets Mai, the middle sister, who at first mistakes her for Konami as they look exactly alike. The daughter resents Mai, the middle sister, for abandoning her mother which further deepens the latter Mai's depression. Konami's daughter, Mai, develops a similar personality to that of the other Mai in that she chooses to close herself off from having friends. In the final episode, an adult Mai explains the travels to Daisuke, the male child of Asuka and Daichi. Mai is voiced by in Japanese Tomoko Kawakami and in English Maggie Blue O'Hara.

Miyuki
 is a young girl who lives at the hospital due to having a weak body since birth. She enjoys watching the "Magical Girl Lilo" cartoon and after her father meets Mii who is at the cosplaying with the evidential outfit. After Mii forces her to dress up as well and they go around town, Miyuki collapses due to her weakness whereupon Mii uses her healing powers curing Miyuki of her weakness permanently. Miyuki is voiced in Japanese by Mikako Takahashi and by in English Brenna O'Brien.

Merchandise
Popotan has had a number of merchandise based on the female characters. All of the major romanceable girls from the game have had figurines designed for them, with Mii getting additional ones from other sets. Resin model kits for all of the major protagonists as well as other important female characters have been released, several of which are in different poses  and Mai's displaying a bare chest. Petit Ferret also released a cell-phone card set, dripping matt, and other items based around the anime's protagonists. One official anime wallpaper was released without being included in other products. Mii has also been featured in an e-calendar at "Bishōjo Kyaramero"'s website. Unagi was also featured in a plushie of her ferret form for sale by Petit Ferret/Popo House.

In December 2003 and March 2004, WellMADE released two mini-games based around the character Unagi free to the public in a series entitled . These games, where Unagi is the heroine, are meant to humorous and fun. The second one allows Unagi to transform into her humanoid form after a certain point in the game.

Reception

Visual novel
The visual novel's Japanese voice actor have all commented on their time working on the title. Mayu Fujisaki comments that her time spent of Ai's character was a valuable experience. She comments that Ai is cute, gentle and tolerant.

Anime
Mania states that Mea is "[t]he oddest of the [main] characters" since she appears first as very robotic in both action and appearance, but as the story progresses and her personality evolves becomes less so. Another Mania reviewer claims that Mai, the middle sister, is by far the most interesting of the characters since her episodes revolve around the struggle of trying to live an ordinary life when doing so it impossible and thus her story outshines the other main characters' stories. In a second review, the former Mania reviewer did praise the way the anime brought back Daichi as an adult and the way the anime handled the issues that would likely occur with such a fantastical encounter, though in another review by the same author he criticizes the anime for placing Mai and Mii on the journey through time and space since they'll never have a chance to grow up, although he later admits he might be reading too much into things.

All of the female characters, but especially Mii's, bath and other partial nudity scenes from anime sparked a lot of controversy when the anime was released on North American DVDs as they had a lot uncensored images of the character's chests, though Akio Watanabe is still credited with having great character designs. Mania stats that most of the main anime characters are mostly visually appealing, though still stereotypical, designs and claims "the most interesting looking character" is Konami with Miyuki close behind. Mania goes further and claims that Miyuki actually fills the costume better cosplaying as a "Magical Girl" than Mii.

Notes

References
General

Specific

Lists of anime and manga characters
Lists of visual novel characters
Popotan